The 2022 YellaWood 500 was a NASCAR Cup Series race held on October 2, 2022, at Talladega Superspeedway in Lincoln, Alabama. Contested for 188 laps on the  asphalt superspeedway, it was the 31st race of the 2022 NASCAR Cup Series season, fifth race of the Playoffs and second race of the Round of 12.

Report

Background

Talladega Superspeedway, originally known as Alabama International Motor Superspeedway (AIMS), is a motorsports complex located north of Talladega, Alabama. It is located on the former Anniston Air Force Base in the small city of Lincoln. The track is a tri-oval and was constructed in the 1960s by the International Speedway Corporation, a business controlled by the France family. Talladega is most known for its steep banking and the unique location of the start/finish line that's located just past the exit to pit road. The track currently hosts the NASCAR series such as the NASCAR Cup Series, Xfinity Series and the Camping World Truck Series. Talladega is the longest NASCAR oval with a length of  tri-oval like the Daytona International Speedway, which also is a  tri-oval. 

Noah Gragson replaced Alex Bowman in the No. 48 car after Bowman suffered from concussion-like symptoms sustained after a rear impact crash on the previous race. Gragson had originally been intended to drive the No. 62 car for this race; Justin Allgaier  replaced Gragson in the No. 62 car.

Entry list
 (R) denotes rookie driver.
 (i) denotes driver who is ineligible for series driver points.

Qualifying

Qualifying results

Race

Stage Results

Stage One
Laps: 60

Stage Two
Laps: 60

Final Stage Results

Stage Three
Laps: 68

Race statistics
 Lead changes: 57 among 17 different drivers
 Cautions/Laps: 6 for 25 laps
 Red flags: 0
 Time of race: 3 hours, 15 minutes and 23 seconds
 Average speed:

Penalties
Kevin Harvick, finishing 29th and already eliminated from the playoffs, was docked 100 owner and driver points when the NASCAR R&D Center discovered illegal alterations to his car's body. His crew chief Rodney Childers was also suspended for four races and fined $100,000. The points penalty meant Harvick had less than 2,000 points (playoff drivers are reset to 2,000 points, plus any bonus points) in the standings as an eliminated playoff driver.

Media

Television
NBC Sports covered the race on the television side. Rick Allen, Jeff Burton, Steve Letarte and six-time Talladega winner Dale Earnhardt Jr. called the race from the broadcast booth. Dave Burns, Kim Coon, Parker Kligerman and Marty Snider handled the pit road duties from pit lane.

Radio
MRN had the radio call for the race, which was also simulcasted on Sirius XM NASCAR Radio. Alex Hayden, Jeff Striegle and Rusty Wallace called the race for MRN when the field races thru the tri-oval. Dave Moody called the action from turn 1, Mike Bagley called the action for MRN when the field races down the backstraightaway, and Dan Hubbard called the race from the Sunoco tower just outside of turn 4. Steve Post, Alex Weaver, Brienne Pedigo, and Jason Toy called the action for MRN from pit lane.

Standings after the race

Drivers' Championship standings

Manufacturers' Championship standings

Note: Only the first 16 positions are included for the driver standings.

Notes

References

YellaWood 500
YellaWood 500
Yella Wood 500
NASCAR races at Talladega Superspeedway